The black spinetail (Telacanthura melanopygia) is a species of swift in the family Apodidae.
It is found in Angola, Cameroon, Central African Republic, Republic of the Congo, Democratic Republic of the Congo, Ivory Coast, Gabon, Ghana, Liberia, Nigeria, and Sierra Leone.

References

black spinetail
Birds of Central Africa
Birds of West Africa
black spinetail
black spinetail
Taxonomy articles created by Polbot